The Somali National Alliance (abbreviated SNA) was a political-military alliance formed on 16 June 1992 by four different rebel groups that had been in opposition to the regime of former Somali President Mohamed Siad Barre.

The SNA was considered to be one of the most powerful factions in the Somali Civil War, and it most notably faced off against the second phase of the United Nations Operation in Somalia (UNOSOM II) in the latter half of 1993.

Following the 1991 split in the United Somali Congress (USC) between Mohamed Farah Aidid and Ali Mahdi, along with the later routing of Barres forces out of Somalia and into Kenya in 1992, a tentative military coalition that had existed between different rebel organizations would morph into the political organization known as the SNA. The alliance would include Aidids wing of the USC, the Somali Patriotic Movement (SPM), the Somali Southern National Movement (SSNM) and Somali Democratic Movement (SDM).

The SNA claimed to possess the goal of working toward forming a national reconciliation government and an eventual multi-party democracy. The SNA would ultimately became the core of the Somali Reconciliation and Restoration Council (SRRC), formed in 2001, which would be incorporated into the internationally recognized Somali Transitional National Government in 2002.

History

Origins

Somali Liberation Army coalition 
Reports that former President Siad Barres organization, the Somali National Front (SNF), was planning to retake Mogadishu led to the creation of a coalition consisting of four rebel groups: Aidids wing of the United Somali Congress (USC), the Somali Patriotic Movement (SPM), the Somali Democratic Movement (SDM) and the Somali Southern National Movement (SSNM). On 17 April 1992 the Somali National Alliances short-lived predecessor, a military coalition known as the Somali Liberation Army (SLA), was formed. Brigadier General Mohamed Farah Aidid would be elected chairman of the SLA that same day. 

The coalition was created with the express goal of preventing Barre from retaking the capital and to further push the last remnants of his troops out of Somalia. Fierce back and forth fighting between SLA forces (led by General Aidid) and SNF forces loyal to President Barre in the fertile inter-riverine areas of southern Somalia would consequently result in the devastating 1992 famine. According to SNA accounts of the final clashes, Barres forces outnumbered SLA forces over six times, but were ambushed and encircled when they left their base in Baidoa and came within 50 km from Mogadishu. Following the defeat, Barres forces were routed into southern Somalia until they were pushed out into Kenya by the SLA on 29 April 1992. According to the SLA, over 500 of Barres troops were taken as prisoners of war and then turned over to the Red Cross.

On 14 May 1992, the SLA seized the strategically important southern port city of Kismayo, and three days later former President Barre would flee to Nigeria. Early on in June 1992 the coalition would publicly announce that it would never accept the deployment of foreign troops on Somali soil, but welcomed and requested humanitarian aid.

Formation of Somali National Alliance 
Following the defeat of Siad Barres forces, on 16 June 1992 the SLA was phased out and the politico-military organization known as the Somali National Alliance was founded by the same four rebel groups of the SLA in the town of Bardere. The Somali Liberation Army would instead morph into the military wing of the newly founded SNA.

Primary clan composition of the SNA:

 USC Aidid faction: Habr Gidr, Xawadle, Gaalje'el and some Ogaden subclans
 SPM: Ogaden and Majerteen
 SDM: Rahanweyn and Digil
 SSNM: Bimaal and southern Dir

The SNA claimed to possess the goal of working toward forming a national reconciliation government and an eventual multi-party democracy. Mohammed Farah Aidid would be elected to serve as the first chairman and nominal leader of the SNA on 10 August 1992, but his ability to impose decisions on the organization was limited, as a council of elders held decision making power for most significant issues. Osman Ali Atto would serve as the chief financier of the SNA

Following the organizations creation, Aidid would strive to add the Isaaq based Somali National Movement (SNM) and Majeerteen based Somali Salvation Democratic Front (SSDF) to the SNA. If this goal were to be achieved, it would leave his prime rival Ali Mahdi as the only major remaining holdout to a unified national government.

Military Capacity 
Most of the SNA's military leadership was made up of former Somali National Army personnel, many of whom possessed military experience. 

Estimates of the strength of the SNA forces in Somalia ranged from 5,000 to 10,000, with presumably 1,500 deployed in Mogadishu according to Historian Stephen Biddle. They were primarily equipped with light infantry weaponry, like the AK-47 assault rifle. Experienced fighters supplemented the main forces with RPG-7 rocket-propelled grenade launchers, sniper rifles, mortars, land mines, recoilless rifles and machine guns.

United Nations Intervention era

UNOSOM I and UNITAF 
In late July 1992 the alliance announced that they were creating a "joint administrative body" to make security arrangements in order to reduce banditry and that they further rejected recent proposals to send 500 UN troops to Somalia. Instead they appealed to the UN to aid the creation of a 6,000 man strong police service to maintain security and Aidid would announce that he agreed with the deployment of 40 UN military observers to Mogadishu. 

The large scale military intervention in late 1992 mobilized nationalist opposition to foreign troops in Somalia and contributed to a significant growth of support for the SNA, which loudly decried perceived U.N. colonial practices.

UNOSOM II 

Following the 5 June 1993 attack on the Pakistanis, the SNA and UNOSOM II would effectively go to war until the 3-4 October 1993 Battle of Mogadishu. During the intervention the SNA would repeatedly utilize anti-colonial, anti-imperialist and anti-American rhetoric in publications, statements and radio broadcasts:"Chairman Mohamed Farah Aidid called on the Somali people never to accept the colonialist device of divide-and-rule being applied by the United States and UNOSOM to divide the Somali people and realize their imperialist ambitions. On the contrary, the Somali people have the right to self-determination. He went on to appeal to the U.S. Congress and people to stop Clinton killing the Somali people and opposing their unity and wishes, which is damaging the image of the American people, of human rights, and the cooperation between the Somali and American peoples. He called on them to work towards settling the matter peacefully and justly" - transcript of SNA broadcast 2nd of September 1993In 1994 the SNA would suffer a fracture when Osman Ali Atto and forces loyal to him would break with the Aidid to ally with Ali Mahdi's Somali Salvation Alliance (SSA). That same year, the Somali National Movement (SNM) also suffered a serious fracture between President Ibrahim Egal of Somaliland and his predecessor Abdirahman Ahmed Ali Tuur. Tuur had allied himself with the Somali National Alliance and called for the reunification of Somaliland with Somalia. Fighting between the two factions broke out in Hargeisa in November 1994, which the forces of President Egal would eventually win, ending Aidids aspirations of incorporating the SNM into an SNA government.

1995 to 2002 
In June 1995, Aidid was removed from chairmanship of the Somali National Alliance by vote conducted by the SNA congress and was replaced by Osman Ali Atto. Later that same month Aidid would declare himself President of Somalia, prompting a joint statement from Ali Mahdi and Osman Atto condemning his declarations. After the death of General Mohammed Farah Aidid in 1996, his son, Hussein Mohamed Farah Aidid, took over the SNA.

During the late 90s the SNA would receive foreign support from both Eritrea and Uganda.

Merger with Somali Government 
During reconciliation talks among Somali leaders in Kenya in December 2001, it was agreed that the Somali National Alliance would be folded into the Transitional National Government (TNG). The TNG proposed to the Transitional National Assembly that the number of cabinet members and parliamentarians be increased to make way for a broader-based government and on 20 January 2002, the assembly would pass the motion.

Leaders of Somali National Alliance

References

Works Cited 
 OCLC 48195594

Defunct political parties in Somalia
Factions in the Somali Civil War
Battle of Mogadishu (1993)
1992 establishments in Somalia
1996 disestablishments in Somalia
Islamic political parties in Somalia